This is a list of sociologists. It is intended to cover those who have made substantive contributions to social theory and research, including any sociological subfield. Scientists in other fields and philosophers are not included, unless at least some of their work is defined as being specifically sociological in nature.

A

 Peter Abell, British sociologist
 Mark Abrams (1906–1994), British sociologist, political scientist and pollster
 Janet Abu-Lughod (1928–2013), American sociologist
 Jane Addams (1860–1935), American social worker, sociologist, public philosopher and reformer
 Theodor Adorno (1903–1969), German philosopher and cultural sociologist
 Richard Alba, American sociologist
 Francesco Alberoni, Italian sociologist
 Martin Albrow, British sociologist
 Jeffrey C. Alexander, American sociologist
 Edwin Amenta, American sociologist
 Nancy Ammerman, American sociologist
 Eric Anderson, American-British sociologist
 Elijah Anderson, American sociologist
 Stanislav Andreski, Polish-British sociologist
 Aaron Antonovsky, Israeli sociologist
 Arjun Appadurai, Indian sociologist
 Andrew Arato, Hungarian-American sociologist
 Margaret Archer, British sociologist
 Hannah Arendt (1906–1975), German political theorist
 Alcira Argumedo (1940–2021), Argentine sociologist 
 Aristoteles (384 bC-322 aC), Ancient Greek philosopher and sociologist
 Signe Arnfred, Danish sociologist
 Raymond Aron (1905–1983), French philosopher and sociologist
 Stanley Aronowitz, American sociologist
 Giovanni Arrighi, Italian sociologist
 Johan Asplund (1937–2018), Swedish sociologist
 Vilhelm Aubert (1922–1988), Norwegian sociologist
 Francisco Ayala, Spanish sociologist and novelist

B

 Élisabeth Badinter (born 1944), French philosopher and historian
 Patrick Baert, British sociologist
 Sergio Bagú, Argentinian sociologist
 Kenneth D. Bailey, American sociologist
 Georges Balandier, French sociologist
 Emily Greene Balch, American professor of sociology and Nobel Peace laureate
 Robert Balch, American sociologist
 E. Digby Baltzell, American sociologist
 Eileen Barker (born 1938), British sociologist and professor
 Barry Barnes, British sociologist
 Liberty Barnes, American sociologist
 Roland Barthes (1915–1980), French literary critic, literary and social theorist, philosopher, and semiotician
 Robert Bartholomew (born 1958), American medical sociologist living in New Zealand
 Roger Bastide, French sociologist
 Gregory Bateson (1904–1980), English/American cybernetician
 Jean Baubérot (born 1941), French historian and sociologist
 Jean Baudrillard (1929–2007), French cultural theorist
 Zygmunt Bauman (1925–2017), Polish/British sociologist
 Frank Bean, American sociologist
 Peter Bearman (born 1956), American sociologist
 Ulrich Beck (1944–2015), German sociologist
 Gary Becker, American economist
 Howard P. Becker, American sociologist
 Howard S. Becker (born 1928), American sociologist
 Jens Beckert, German sociologist
 Richard F. Behrendt (1908–1973), German sociologist
 Daniel Bell (1919–2011), American sociologist
 Robert N. Bellah, American sociologist
 Walden Bello, Filipino sociologist
 Reinhard Bendix, German-American sociologist
 Walter Benjamin (1892–1940), German cultural writer and sociologist
 Albert Benschop (1949–2018), Dutch sociologist
 Joseph Berger, American sociologist
 Peter L. Berger (1929–2017), Austro-American sociologist
 Pierre L. van den Berghe, Belgian sociologist
 Henri Bergson (1859–1941), French philosopher
 Jessie Bernard, American feminist sociologist
 Eduard Bernstein, German politician and intellectual
 Jean-Michel Berthelot, French sociologist
 Andre Beteille, Indian sociologist
 Krishna Bhattachan, Nepalese sociologist
 Robert Bierstedt, American sociologist
 Norman Birnbaum, American sociologist
 Margunn Bjørnholt (born 1958), Norwegian sociologist and economist
 Donald Black, American sociologist
 Peter Blau (1918–2002), American sociologist
 Kathleen M. Blee (born 1953), American sociologist
 Gisela Bleibtreu-Ehrenberg (born 1929), German sociologist, ethnologist, and sexologist 
 Danielle Bleitrach (born 1938), French sociologist and journalist 
 David Bloor, British sociologist
 Herbert Blumer (1900–1987), American sociologist
 Olivier Bobineau (born 1972), French sociologist
 Sophie Body-Gendrot (1942–2018), French sociologist
 Luc Boltanski, French sociologist
 Scott Boorman (born 1949), American sociologist
 Charles Booth, British social researcher
 Ernst Borinski (1901–1983), German sociologist
 Thomas Bottomore (1920–1992), British sociologist
 Raymond Boudon, French sociologist
 Pierre Bourdieu (1930–2002), French sociologist
 Victor Branford (1863–1930), British sociologist
 Ronald Breiger, American sociologist
 John David Brewer (born 1951), British sociologist
 Carl Brinkmann (1885–1954), German sociologist
 David G. Bromley, American sociologist
 Rogers Brubaker, American sociologist
 Hauke Brunkhorst, German sociologist
 Hans Henrik Reventlow Bruun, Danish sociologist
 Walter F. Buckley, American sociologist
 Michael Burawoy, American sociologist
 Ernest Burgess (1886–1966), Canadian sociologist
 Tom R. Burns, European-American sociologist
 Ronald Burt, American sociologist
 Judith Butler (born 1956), American gender theorist

C

 Roger Caillois, French sociologist
 Craig Calhoun, American sociologist
 Michel Callon, French sociologist
 Elias Canetti, Bulgaria-born novelist and outsider sociologist
 Georges Canguilhem, French intellectual
 Fernando Henrique Cardoso (born 1931), Brazilian sociologist, former President of Brazil
 Kathleen Carley, American computational sociologist
 Antonio Caso, Mexican sociologist
 Robert Castel, French sociologist
 Julieta Castellanos (born 1952), Honduran sociologist
 Manuel Castells (born 1942), Spanish sociologist and urban planner
 Cornelius Castoriadis (1922–1997), Greek philosopher and political theorist
 Michel de Certeau, French cultural sociologist
 Francis Stuart Chapin (1888–1974), American sociologist
 Christopher Chase-Dunn, American sociologist
 Louis Chauvel (born 1967), French sociologist
 Nancy Chodorow (born 1944), American sociologist, psychoanalyst, and gender theorist
 Nicholas A. Christakis, American sociologist
 Ann-Dorte Christensen, Danish sociologist
 Chua Beng Huat, Singaporean sociologist
 Aaron Cicourel, American sociologist
 Dieter Claessens (1921–1997), German sociologist
 Lars Clausen (1935–2010), German sociologist
 Marshall B. Clinard (1911–2010), American sociologist (criminology)
 Clifford Clogg, American sociologist
 Richard Cloward (1926–2001), American sociologist
 Philip N. Cohen, American sociologist
 Ronald L. Cohen, American social psychologist
 Stanley Cohen, British sociologist (criminology)
 James Samuel Coleman (1926–1995), American sociologist
 Harry Collins, British sociologist
 Patricia Hill Collins (born 1948), American sociologist
 Randall Collins, American sociologist
 Auguste Comte (1798–1857), French founder of sociology
 Nicolas de Condorcet, French mathematician and early sociologist
 Dalton Conley, American sociologist
 R.W. Connell (born 1944), Australian sociologist
 Paul Connerton, British sociologist
 Charles Cooley (1864–1929), American sociologist
 Anna Julia Cooper, American sociologist
 Lewis A. Coser (1913–2003), American sociologist
 Carl J. Couch (1925–1994), American sociologist
 Douglas E. Cowan, Canadian sociologist
 Maxine Leeds Craig, American sociologist
 Colin Crouch, British sociologist
 Michel Crozier, French sociologist
 Agustin Cueva, Ecuadorian sociologist
 Stefan Czarnowski (1879–1937), Polish sociologist

D

 Robert Dahl (1915–2014), American political scientist
 Ralf Dahrendorf (1929–2009), German-British sociologist and politician
 Dankwart Danckwerts (1933–2012), German sociologist
 Randy David, Filipino sociologist
 Leonore Davidoff (1932–2014), American-British sociologist and historian
 Kingsley Davis (1908–1997), American sociologist
 Georges Davy (1883–1976), French sociologist
 François de Singly, French sociologist
 Régis Debray, French mediologist
 Alexander Deichsel (born 1935), German sociologist
 Christine Delphy (born 1941), French sociologist, feminist, and theorist
 Gilles Deleuze (1925–1995), French philosopher
 Donatella della Porta, Italian sociologist and political scientist
 Christine Delphy, French sociologist
 Bogdan Denitch (1929–2016), American sociologist
 Régis Dericquebourg (born 1947), French sociologist of religions
 Jacques Derrida (1930–2004), French philosopher
 Heinz Dieterich, German-Mexican sociologist
 Bulent Diken, Danish sociologist
 Wilhelm Dilthey (1833–1911), German historian, psychologist and sociologist
 Helen Dinerman (1920–1974), American public opinion researcher
 Paul DiMaggio, American cultural sociologist
 Georgi Dimitrov Dimitrov, Bulgarian sociologist
 Stuart C. Dodd (1900–1975), American sociologist
 G. William Domhoff, American sociologist
 Mary Douglas (1921–2007), British anthropologist and sociologist of perception
 Tommy Douglas (1904–1986), Canadian politician
 W. E. B. Du Bois (1868–1963), American sociologist and civil rights leader
 Denis Duclos, French sociologist
 Otis Dudley Duncan (1921–2004), American sociologist
 Mitchell Duneier, American sociologist
 Eric Dunning (1936–2019), British sociologist
 Émile Durkheim (1858–1917), French sociologist
 Troy Duster, American sociologist
 Maurice Duverger (1917–2014), French sociologist
 Jean Duvignaud (1921–2007), French sociologist

E

 Gerald L. Eberlein (1930–2010), German sociologist
 Alain Ehrenberg, French sociologist
 Eugen Ehrlich, German sociologist
 Shmuel Noah Eisenstadt (1923–2010), Israeli sociologist
 Riane Eisler (born 1931), cultural historian, systems scientist, educator, and attorney
 Norbert Elias (1897–1990), German sociologist
 Jacques Ellul (1912-1994), French sociologist
 Jon Elster, Norwegian sociologist
 Mustafa Emirbayer, American sociologist
 Hugo O. Engelmann (1917–2002), American sociologist
 Friedrich Engels (1820–1895), German socialist philosopher
 Paula England, American sociologist
 Ronald Enroth (born 1938), American sociologist
 Kai T. Erikson (born 1931), American sociologist
 Fernando Escalante Gonzalbo, Mexican sociologist
 Gosta Esping-Andersen, Danish sociologist
 Amitai Etzioni (born 1929), American sociologist
 Peter B. Evans, American sociologist

F

 Orlando Fals Borda (1925–2008), Colombian sociologist
 Frantz Fanon, Martinican intellectual and sociologist
 Rick Fantasia, American sociologist
 Thomas Fararo (1933–2020), American mathematical sociologist
 Paul Fauconnet (1874–1938), French sociologist
 Joe Feagin, American sociologist
 Fei Xiaotong (1910–2005), Chinese sociologist and anthropologist
 Anuška Ferligoj, Slovenian mathematical sociologist
 Florestan Fernandes (1920–1995), Brazilian sociologist
 Myra Marx Ferree (born 1949), American sociologist
 Enrico Ferri, Italian sociologist and criminologist
 Gary Alan Fine (born 1950), American sociologist
 Claude Fischer (born 1948), American author of the subcultural theory of urbanism
 George Fitzhugh (1806–1881), American social theorist 
 Crystal Marie Fleming (born 1981), American sociologist and author
 Peter Flora, Austrian sociologist
 Heinz von Foerster (1911–2002), Austrian/American cybernetician
 Pim Fortuyn (1948–2002), Dutch sociologist author and politician
 Daniel A. Foss (1940–2014), American sociologist
 John Bellamy Foster, American sociologist and journalist
 Michel Foucault (1926–1984), French philosopher
 Alfred Jules Émile Fouillée, French philosopher and sociologist
 Charles Fourier (1772–1837), French proto-sociologist
 Mary Frank Fox, American sociologist
 Renée Fox, American sociologist
 Andre Gunder Frank (1929–2005), German economic historian and sociologist
 Nancy Fraser, American social theorist
 Hans Freyer (1887–1969), German sociologist and philosopher
 Gilberto Freyre (1900–1987), Brazilian sociologist
 Georges Friedmann, French sociologist
 Steve Fuller, American sociologist
 Celso Furtado (1920–2004), Brazilian economist

G

 Luciano Gallino, Italian sociologist
 Francis Galton (1822–1911), English statistician
 Johan Galtung, Norwegian sociologist, mathematician, and founder of peace studies
 Diego Gambetta, Italian sociologist
 Herbert Gans (born 1927), American sociologist
 Delphine Gardey (born 1967), French sociologist
 Harold Garfinkel (1917–2011), American sociologist
 David W Garland, British sociologist
 Marcel Gauchet, French sociologist
 John Gaventa, American-British sociologist
 Patrick Geddes, Scottish sociologist
 Clifford Geertz, American anthropologist
 Arnold Gehlen (1904–1976), German philosopher and sociologist
 Theodor Geiger (1891–1952), German sociologist
 Ernest Gellner (1925–1995), Czech-British philosopher and social anthropologist
 Govind Sadashiv Ghurye (1893–1983), Indian sociologist
 Anthony Giddens (born 1938), English sociologist
 Franklin Henry Giddings, American sociologist
 Nigel Gilbert, British sociologist
 Charlotte Perkins Gilman, American sociologist
 Paul Gilroy, British sociologist
 Salvador Giner, Spanish sociologist
 Corrado Gini (1884–1965), Italian statistician
 Morris Ginsberg, British sociologist
 Herbert Gintis, American behavioral scientist
 Henry Giroux, American sociologist of education
 Todd Gitlin, American sociologist
 Barney Glaser, American sociologist
 David Glass (1911–1978), British sociologist
 Barry Glassner (born 1952), American sociologist
 Nathan Glazer, American sociologist
 Max Gluckman (1911–1975), South African/English social anthropologist
 Erving Goffman (1922–1982), Canadian interactionistic sociologist
 Steven J. Gold (born 1955), American sociologist
 Lucien Goldmann, Romanian/French sociologist
 Jack Goldstone, American sociologist
 John H. Goldthorpe (born 1935), British sociologist
 Yasunosuke Gonda, Japanese sociologist
 Jeff Goodwin, American sociologist
 Alvin Gouldner, American sociologist
 Ziya Gökalp (1876–1924), Turkish sociologist, writer, poet and political activist
 Isacque Graeber (1905–1984), sociologist and Jewish historian
 Antonio Gramsci (1891–1937), Italian Marxist and social theorist
 Mark Granovetter, American sociologist
 Richard Grathoff (1934–2013), German sociologist and phenomenologist
 Andrew M. Greeley, American sociologist, priest, writer
 Liah Greenfeld (born 1954), Russian/American sociologist
 Leonid Grinin (born 1958), Russian sociologist
 Ludwig Gumplowicz (1838–1909), Polish sociologist, one of the founders of European sociology
 Dipankar Gupta (born 1949), Indian sociologist
 Georges Gurvitch, Russian/French sociologist
 Dimitrie Gusti (1880–1955), Romanian sociologist, the creator of the sociological monographic method

H

 Jürgen Habermas (born 1929), German social theorist
 Jeffrey K. Hadden (1937–2003), American sociologist
 Maurice Halbwachs (1877–1945), French philosopher and sociologist
 Drew Halfmann (born 1967), American sociologist
 Bente Halkier, Danish sociologist
 John A. Hall (born 1949), British/Canadian sociologist
 Stuart Hall (1932–2014), British cultural theorist
 Donna Haraway (born 1944), American gender and technology theorist
 Eszter Hargittai, Hungarian sociologist
 Marta Harnecker, Chilean sociologist
 Chandrakala A. Hate (1903–1990), Indian sociologist, social worker, and author
 Darnell Hawkins (born 1946), American sociologist, criminologist, and emeritus professor
 Peter Hedström, Swedish sociologist
 Samuel Heilman, American sociologist
 Wilhelm Heitmeyer, German sociologist
 Dirk Helbing, Swiss sociologist
 Horst Helle, German sociologist
 Ágnes Heller, Hungarian philosopher and sociologist
 Celia Stopnicka Heller (1922–2011), American sociologist
 Will Herberg (1901–1977), American sociologist
 John Heritage, American sociologist
 Robert Hertz, French sociologist
 Danièle Hervieu-Léger, French sociologist
 Michael D. Higgins, Irish sociologist and current Irish president
 Paul Hirst, British sociologist
 Thomas Hobbes (1588–1679), British philosopher
 Leonard Trelawny Hobhouse, pioneer British sociologist
 Arlie Russell Hochschild, American sociologist
 Richard Hoggart (1918–2014), British sociologist
 John Holloway, Irish sociologist
 Susanne Holmström, Danish sociologist
 Robert J. Holton, British sociologist
 George C. Homans (1910–1989), American behavioral sociologist
 Axel Honneth (born 1949), German social theorist
 Ida R. Hoos (1912–2007), American sociologist
 Max Horkheimer (1895–1973), German social theorist
 Irving Louis Horowitz, American sociologist
 Eugenio María de Hostos, Puerto Rican sociologist
 Philip N. Howard, Canadian American sociologist
 Spomenka Hribar (born 1941), Slovenian sociologist, philosopher politician, and public intellectual
 Everett Hughes, American sociologist
 Stephen J. Hunt, British sociologist

I

 Octavio Ianni (1926–2004), Brazilian sociologist
 Ibn Khaldun (1332/ah732–1406/ah808), North African historian, forerunner of modern historiography, sociology, and economics
 Kancha Ilaiah (born 1952), Indian political scientist and social activist
 Eva Illouz, Moroccan sociologist
 Jose Ingenieros, Argentinian sociologist
 Harold Innis, Canadian sociologist who developed staples theory
 John Keith Irwin (1929–2010), American sociologist known for his expertise on the American prison system
 Larry Isaac, American sociologist

J

 Michael Hviid Jacobsen, Danish sociologist
 Eliezer Jaffe, Israeli-American sociologist
 Jacquelyne Jackson (1932–2004), American sociologist and educator
 Stevi Jackson (born 1951), British sociologist
 Janet L. Jacobs (born 1948), American sociologist
 Marie Jahoda (1907–2001), Austrian-British sociologist and social psychologist 
 Marie Jaisson, French sociologist
 Ayesha Jalal, Pakistani-American historian, sociologist, and professor 
 Fredric Jameson, American philosopher and social theorist
 Morris Janowitz, American sociologist
 James M. Jasper (born 1957), American sociologist
 Gail Jefferson (1938–2008), American sociologist and conversation analyst
 Yasmin Jiwani, feminist academic and activist
 Hans Joas, German social theorist
 Carole Joffe, American sociologist
 Benton Johnson (born 1928), American sociologist
 Guy Benton Johnson (1901–1991), American sociologist
 Miriam M. Johnson (1928–2007), American sociologist
 Rodrigo Jokisch (born 1946), German-Mexican sociologist and social theorist
 Frank Lancaster Jones (born 1937), Australian sociologist
 Lewis Wade Jones (1910–1979), African/American sociologist and educator
 Danny Jorgensen, American sociologist
 Paul Jorion, Belgian American sociologist and cognitive scientist

K

 Dirk Kaesler (born 1944), German sociologist
 Boris Kagarlitsky, Russian sociologist
Irawati Karve, Indian anthropologist and sociologist 
 Alexandr Kapto, Russian and Ukrainian scientist, sociologist, and political scientist; a diplomat, journalist, politician, and statesman
 Elihu Katz, American sociologist
 Nitasha Kaul, Indian Kashmiri sociologist, writer, and poet
 Karl Kautsky, Czech Marxist theorist
 Vytautas Kavolis, Lithuanian-American sociologist and literary critic
 Frances Kellor (1873–1952), American sociologist, social reformer, and investigator
 Stephen A. Kent, Canadian sociologist
 Lane Kenworthy, American sociologist
 Sherin Khankan, Danish sociologist
Abdelkebir Khatibi (1938–2009), Moroccan literary critic, novelist, philosopher, playwright, poet, and sociologist
 Aquila Berlas Kiani (1921–2012), Indian sociologist and educator
 Baruch Kimmerling, Israeli sociologist
 Susan Myra Kingsbury (1870–1949), American sociologist
 Julieta Kirkwood (1936–1985), Chilean sociologist, political scientist, and feminist activist
 Evelyn M. Kitagawa (1920–2007), American sociologist, demographer, and educator
 John Kitsuse, Japanese-American sociologist
 Gabriele Klein (born 1957), sociologist, dance theorist, and educator
 Bernardo Kliksberg, Argentinian sociologist
 Eric Klinenberg, American sociologist
 Karin Knorr Cetina (born 1944), Austrian sociologist
 Antonina Kłoskowska (1919–2001), Polish sociologist
 Karin Knorr Cetina (born 1944), Austrian sociologist
 Katsuya Kodama (born 1959), Japanese sociologist and peace researcher 
 Mirra Komarovsky (1905–1999), Russian-American sociologist
 René König (1906–1992), German sociologist
 Andrey Korotayev (born 1961), Russian sociologist
 Reinhart Koselleck (1923–2006), German historian and social theorist
 Maksim Kovalevsky (1851–1916), Russian sociologist
 Siegfried Kracauer, German sociologist
 Julia Kristeva, Bulgarian-French feminist sociologist
 Alfred L. Kroeber (1876–1960), American anthropologist
 Peter Kropotkin (1842–1921), Russian anarchist thinker
 Thomas S. Kuhn (1922–1996), American science theorist
 Eugene M. Kulischer (1891–1956), Russian/American sociologist
 Charles Kurzman, American sociologist
 Martin Kusch, Austrian philosopher and sociologist

L

 William Labov (born 1927), American sociolinguist and dialectologist
 Jacques Lacan (1901–1981), French psychoanalyst
 Richard Lachmann, American sociologist, specialist in comparative historical sociology
 Ernesto Laclau, Argentinian sociologist
 Joyce Ladner, American sociologist and activist
 Imre Lakatos, Hungarian philosopher
 Janja Lalich (born 1945), American sociologist
 Michele Lamont, American sociologist
 Diane Lamoureux (born 1954), Canadian sociologist, professor, and writer
 David C. Lane (born 1956), American sociologist
 Ralph Larkin, American sociologist
 Scott Lash, American sociologist
 Harold Lasswell, American political sociologist
 Bruno Latour (born 1947), French sociologist of science
 Peter Lavrovich Lavrov, Russian sociologist
 John Law, British sociologist
 Paul F. Lazarsfeld (1901–1976), Austrian/American sociologist
 Gustave Le Bon (1841–1931), French social psychologist
 Frederic Le Play, early French sociologist
 Anna Leander, Danish sociologist
 Emil Lederer, German sociologist
 Henri Lefebvre (1901–1991), French Marxist philosopher
 Charles Lemert (born 1937), American sociologist
 Vladimir Lenin, Russian revolutionary and intellectual
 Gerhard Lenski, American evolutionary sociologist
 Magdalena León de Leal (born 1939), Colombian sociologist 
 Yuri Levada, Russian sociologist
 John Levi Martin, American sociologist
 Claude Lévi-Strauss (1908–2009), French anthropologist
 Jack Levin (born 1941), American sociologist/criminologist
 Barry B. Levine (1941–2020), American sociologist
 Ruth Levitas, British sociologist
 Daniel Levy, German-American sociologist
 Lucien Lévy-Bruhl (1857–1939), French philosopher, sociologist, and ethnographer
 Kurt Lewin, German social psychologist
 Loet Leydesdorff, Dutch sociologist
 Li Yinhe (born 1952), Chinese sociologist, sexologist, and activist
 Nan Lin, American sociologist
 Alfred R. Lindesmith (1905–1991), American sociologist of drug policy
 Frederick B. Lindstrom (1915–1998), American sociologist of the arts
 Gilles Lipovetsky, French philosopher
 Seymour Martin Lipset (1922–2006), American comparativist sociologist
 Émile Littré, French philosopher and sociologist, disciple of Comte
 Omar Lizardo, American sociologist
 John Locke, English philosopher
 David Lockwood, British sociologist
 Joseph Lopreato, American sociologist
 Leo Löwenthal, German sociologist
 Michael Löwy, Brazilian-French sociologist
 Nathalie Luca (born 1966), French sociologist
 Thomas Luckmann (1927–2016), German sociologist
 Anthony Ludovici (1882–1971), British conservative sociologist and philosopher
 Niklas Luhmann (1927–1998), German sociologist (systems theory)
 György Lukács, Hungarian philosopher
 Steven Lukes, British social theorist
 George Lundberg (1895–1966), American sociologist (scientific)
 Rosa Luxemburg (1870–1919), German socialist theoretician
 Robert Staughton Lynd (1892–1970), American sociologist
 Jean-François Lyotard (1924–1998), French philosopher

M

 Amin Maalouf, Lebanese author with a degree in sociology
 Richard Machalek (born 1946), American sociologist and sociobiologist
 Robert Morrison MacIver (1882–1970), Scottish/American sociologist
 Donald A. MacKenzie, British sociologist
 Annie Marion MacLean (1869–1934), Canadian-American applied sociologist
 Michel Maffesoli, French sociologist
 Henry Maine (1822–1888), British jurist and legal historian
 Sinisa Malesevic (born 1969), Irish political and historical sociologist
 Bronisław Malinowski (1884–1942), Polish social anthropologist
 Thomas Malthus (1766–1834), English demographer
 Roberto Mangabeira Unger, Brazilian social theorist
 Michael Mann (born 1942), British/American sociologist
 Karl Mannheim (1893–1947), Hungarian/German sociologist
 Peter K. Manning (born 1940), American sociologist
 José María Maravall, Spanish sociologist
 Herbert Marcuse (1898–1979), German/American sociologist (Frankfurt School)
 Władysław Markiewicz (1920–2017), Polish sociologist
 Catherine Marry, French sociologist
 Dennis Marsden, British sociologist
 Alfred Marshall, English economist
 Thomas Humphrey Marshall, British sociologist
 Everett Dean Martin, American sociologist
 Jean Martin, Australian sociologist
 John Levi Martin, American sociologist
 Harriet Martineau (1802–1876), English writer described as 'first female sociologist'
 Vladimir Martynenko (born 1957), Russian sociologist, economist, political scientist
 Margaret Maruani (born 1954), Tunisian-French sociologist
 Gary T. Marx, American sociologist
 Karl Marx (1818–1883), German political philosopher, social theorist
 Tomáš Garrigue Masaryk, Czech sociologist
 Douglas Massey, American sociologist
 Brian Massumi, Canadian social theorist
 Humberto Maturana, Chilean biologist and sociologist of knowledge
 Marcel Mauss (1872–1950), French sociologist
 Carl R May (born 1961), British medical sociologist
 Doug McAdam, American sociologist
 Fayette Avery McKenzie (1872–1957), American sociologist
 Robert McKenzie (1917–1981), Canadian Politics professor and psephologist
 Marshall McLuhan (1911–1980), Canadian educator, philosopher, and scholar
 George Herbert Mead (1863–1931), American philosopher and social psychologist
 Margaret Mead (1901–1978), American cultural anthropologist
 Stephen Mennell (born 1944), English sociologist
Fatema Mernissi (1940–2015), Moroccan feminist writer and sociologist
 Robert K. Merton (1910–2003), American sociologist
 Michael Messner (born 1952), American pro-feminist sociologist
 John W. Meyer, American sociologist
 Robert Michels (1876–1936), German political sociologist
 Ralph Miliband, British sociologist
 C. Wright Mills (1916–1962), American sociologist
 Andrew Milner (born 1950), British-Australian sociologist of literature
 Ann Mische, American sociologist
 Munesuke Mita, Japanese sociologist
 J. Clyde Mitchell (1918–1995), British social anthropologist
 Shinji Miyadai (born 1959), Japanese sociologist
 Tariq Modood, British sociologist
 Abraham Moles (1920–1992), French sociologist, psychologist, and engineer
 Andres Molina Enriquez, Mexican sociologist
 Montesquieu, French philosopher
 James D. Montgomery, American economist and mathematical sociologist
 Barrington Moore, Jr., American political sociologist
 Edgar Morin, French sociologist
 Gaetano Mosca (1858–1941), Italian political and social scientist
 Serge Moscovici, French psychologist and major influence in the study of social representations and social movements
 Chantal Mouffe, Belgian post-Marxist theorist
 Daniel Patrick Moynihan (1927–2003), American sociologist, diplomat and politician
 Radhakamal Mukerjee, Indian sociologist
 Peter A. Munch (1908–1984), Norwegian/American sociologist
 Charles Murray (born 1943), American sociologist
 Gunnar Myrdal (1898–1987), Swedish economist, sociologist, and politician

N

 Ashis Nandy, Indian sociologist
 Vicenç Navarro, Spanish sociologist
 Victor Nee, American sociologist
 Antonio Negri, Italian political philosopher and critic of Luhmann
 Oswald von Nell-Breuning (1890–1991), German Roman Catholic theologian, sociologist and social reformer
 Otto Neurath (1882–1945), Austrian sociologist and political economist
 Otto Newman (born Neumann 1922–2015), Austrian-British sociologist
 Norman H. Nie (1943–2015), Inventor of SPSS
 Robert Nisbet (1913–1996), American sociologist
 Helga Nowotny (born 1937), Austrian sociologist

O

 Claus Offe (born 1940), German sociologist
 William F. Ogburn (1886–1959), American sociologist
 Lloyd Ohlin (1918–2008), American sociologist
 Michael Omi, American sociologist
 Gail Omvedt (1941–2021), American/Indian sociologist
 T. K. Oommen, Indian sociologist
 Franz Oppenheimer (1864–1943), German sociologist and political economist
 José Ortega y Gasset (1883–1955), Spanish philosopher
 Stanislaw Ossowski (1897–1963), Polish sociologist
 Moisey Ostrogorsky (1853–1921), Russian sociologist

P

 Vilfredo Pareto (1848–1923), Italian economist and sociologist
 Robert E. Park (1864–1944), American sociologist
 Talcott Parsons (1902–1979), American sociologist
 C.J. Pascoe, American sociologist
 Jean-Claude Passeron, French sociologist
 Orlando Patterson, American sociologist
 Karl Pearson (1857–1936), English statistician
 Willie Pearson Jr, American sociologist
 Jacqueline Peschard (1965), Mexican sociologist 
 James Petras, American sociologist
 Jean Piaget (1896–1980), Swiss developmental psychologist
 Andrew Pickering, British sociologist
 Trevor Pinch, British sociologist
 Michael Plekon, American sociologist
 Helmuth Plessner, German sociologist
 Joel M. Podolny, American sociologist
 Karl Polanyi, Hungarian economist
 Friedrich Pollock, German social scientist
 Karl Popper, Austrian philosopher
 John Porter (1921–1979), Canadian sociologist
 Alejandro Portes, Cuban-American sociologist
 Adam Possamai, Belgian Born Sociologist
 Nicos Poulantzas (1936–1979), Greek political sociologist
 Émile Poulat, French historian and sociologist
 Walter W. Powell, American sociologist
 Ricardo Pozas Arciniega, Mexican sociologist and anthropologist
 Suzana Prates (1940-1988), Brazilian feminist sociologist and academic
 Anette Prehn, Danish sociologist
 Harriet B. Presser (died 2012), American sociologist and demographer
 Samuel H. Preston, American demographer and sociologist
 Ilya Prigogine, Belgian chemist, main contribution to sociology is dissipative structures theory
 Pierre-Joseph Proudhon (1809–1865), French utopian socialist thinker
 Adam Przeworski, Polish political sociologist
 Jade Puget (born 1973), American musician
 Robert Putnam (born 1941), American political scientist
 Bindeshwar Pathak (born 1943), Indian sociologist

Q

 Sigrid Quack, German sociologist
 Enrico Quarantelli (1924–2017), American sociologist
 Adolphe Quetelet (1796–1874), French statistician and sociologist
 Anibal Quijano (1930–2017), Peruvian sociologist
 Richard Quinney (born 1934), American sociologist

R

 Alfred Reginald Radcliffe-Brown (1881–1955), British social anthropologist
 Charles C. Ragin, American sociologist
 Gustav Ratzenhofer, Austrian sociologist
 Stephen Raudenbush, American sociologist and statistician
 Aviad Raz (born 1968), Israeli sociologist and anthropologist
 Sal Restivo, American sociologist
 John Rex (1925–2011), British sociologist
 James Mahmud Rice (born 1972), Australian sociologist
 Paul Ricoeur, French philosopher
 David Riesman, American sociologist
 George Ritzer (born 1940), American sociologist
 Roland Robertson, British sociologist
 William I. Robinson, American sociologist
 Terje Rød-Larsen (born 1947), Norwegian diplomat and sociologist
 Jesús M. de Miguel Rodríguez (born 1947), Spanish sociologist
 Arnold Marshall Rose, American sociologist
 Gillian Rose, British sociologist
 Nikolas Rose, British sociologist
 Paul Rosenfels (1909–1985), American psychologist and sociologist
 Eugen Rosenstock-Huessy (1888–1973), German social philosopher
 Jean-Jacques Rousseau, Swiss philosopher
 Rubén G. Rumbaut, Cuban-American sociologist
 W. G. Runciman, British sociologist
 Arne Runeberg (1912–1979), Finnish sociologist, anthropologist and linguist

S

 Harvey Sacks (died 1975), American sociologist and ethnomethodologist
 Renaud Sainsaulieu (1936–2002), French sociologist concerned with the sociology of organizations
 Henri de Saint-Simon (1760–1825), French philosopher and social thinker
 Patricia Salas O'Brien (born 1958), Peruvian sociologist and Minister of Education
 Robert J. Sampson, American sociologist
 Pierre Sansot, French sociologist
 Boaventura de Sousa Santos, Portuguese sociologist
 Giovanni Sartori (1924–2017), Italian political scientist
 Saskia Sassen (born 1949), American sociologist
 Peter Saunders, Australian sociologist
 Ferdinand de Saussure (1857–1913), Swiss linguist (structuralism)
 Albert Schäffle, German sociologist
 Thomas J. Scheff, American sociologist
 Emanuel Schegloff, American sociologist
 Max Scheler, German philosopher and founder of the sociology of knowledge
 Helmut Schelsky (1912–1984), German sociologist
 Juraj Schenk (born 1948), Slovak sociologist
 Herbert Schiller, American sociologist
 Kurt C. Schlichting, American sociologist
 Wolfgang Schluchter, German sociologist
 Paul Schnabel, Dutch sociologist
 Allan Schnaiberg (1939–2009), American environmental sociologist
 Juliet Schor, American sociologist
 Joseph Alois Schumpeter (1883–1950), Austrian economist
 Alfred Schütz (1899–1959), Austrian philosopher and sociologist (phenomenology)
 Michael Schwartz (born 1942), American sociologist
 John Scott (born 1949), British sociologist
 Leonard Seabrooke, Australian sociologist
 Jean Séguy, French sociologist of religions (1925–2007)
 Steven Seidman, American sociologist
 Pınar Selek, Turkish sociologist
 Philip Selznick, American sociologist
 Amartya Sen, Indian economist influential in the sociology of development
 Richard Sennett (born 1943), American sociologist and public figure
 William H. Sewell, American sociologist
 Steven Shapin, American sociologist
 Jeremy J. Shapiro, American sociologist
 Ali Shariati (1933–1977), Iranian sociologist and writer
 Tamotsu Shibutani, Japanese-American sociologist
 Bahija Ahmed Shihab (1932–2012), Iraqi sociologist and professor
 Edward Shils, American sociologist
 Anson Shupe, American sociologist
 Volkmar Sigusch, German sociologist and sexuologe
 Charles E. Silberman, American criminologist
 François Simiand, French sociologist
 Georg Simmel (1858–1918), German sociologist and philosopher
 Herbert A. Simon, American social scientist
 Theda Skocpol (born 1947), American sociologist and political scientist
 Albion Woodbury Small (1854–1926), American sociologist
 Neil Smelser, American sociologist
 Adam Smith (1723–1790), Scottish economist and philosopher
 Christian Smith (born 1960), American sociologist of religion
 Dorothy E. Smith (born 1926), British/American sociologist and gender theorist
 Stephen C. Smith (born 1968), American sociologist and 21st century trend researcher
 Tom Snijders, Dutch mathematical sociologist
 David A. Snow (born 1942), American sociologist
 Werner Sombart (1863–1941), German economist and sociologist
 Georges Sorel, French philosopher
 Bernardo Sorj (born 1948), Brazilian sociologist
 Pitirim Sorokin (1889–1968), Russian sociologist
 Herbert Spencer (1820–1903), English philosopher
 Oswald Spengler (1880–1936), German philosopher
 Lynette Spillman, American sociologist
 Hasso Spode, German sociologist and historian
 M N Srinivas (1916–1999), Indian sociologist
 Susan Star, American sociologist
 Carl Nicolai Starcke, Danish sociologist
 David C. Stark, American sociologist
 Paul Starr, American sociologist
 Rodolfo Stavenhagen, Mexican anthropologist and sociologist
 George Steinmetz, American sociologist
 Ana María Díaz Stevens, Puerto Rican-American sociologist
 Samuel A. Stouffer, American sociologist
 Anselm L. Strauss (1916–1996), American sociologist
 Lucy Suchman, American sociologist
 Mark Suchman, American sociologist
 Thomas Sugrue, American historian and sociologist
 William Graham Sumner (1840–1910), American sociologist
 Eilert Sundt (1817–1875), Norwegian sociologist
 Edwin Sutherland (1893–1950), American criminologist
 Ian Svenonius, American cultural sociologist
 Richard Swedberg, Swedish sociologist
 Ann Swidler, American sociologist
 Jan Szczepanski (1913–2004), Polish sociologist
 Iván Szelényi, Hungarian-American sociologist
 Piotr Sztompka (born 1944), Polish sociologist

T

 Hippolyte Taine (1828–1893), French positivist historian and critic
 Yasuma Takada (1883–1972), Japanese sociologist
 Salim Tamari, Palestinian historical sociologist
 Lisa Taraki, Palestinian sociologist
 Alexander Tarasov, Russian sociologist
 Gabriel Tarde (1843–1904), French sociologist and social psychologist
 Sidney Tarrow, American sociologist
 R. H. Tawney (1880–1962), English ethical socialist
 Dorceta Taylor, American environmental sociologist
 Ian Taylor (1944–2001), English sociologist and criminologist
 Laurie Taylor (born 1936), English sociologist and broadcaster
 Göran Therborn, Swedish-British sociologist
 W. I. Thomas (1863–1947), American social psychologist
 E. P. Thompson (1924–1993), British socialist historian
 John Thompson (1979–2021), British sociologist of culture and media
 Sarah Thornton (born 1965), Canadian sociologist, writer, and ethnographer 
 Ole Thyssen, Danish sociologist 
 Charles Tilly (1929–2008), American sociologist
 Nicholas Timasheff (1886–1970), Russian sociologist
 Valery Tishkov (born 1941), Russian ethnologist and sociologist
 Alexis de Tocqueville (1805–1859), French essayist and political analyst
 Ferdinand Tönnies (1855–1936), German philosopher and founder of German sociology
 Alain Touraine (born 1925), French sociologist
 Peter Townsend (1928–2009), British sociologist of poverty
 Judith Treas, American sociologist
 Renato Treves (1907–1992), Italian sociologist
 Ernst Troeltsch (1865–1923), German sociologist and philosopher
 Raimo Tuomela (1940–2020), Finnish philosopher and social theorist
 Sherry Turkle, American sociologist
 Bryan S. Turner, British sociologist
 Jonathan H. Turner, American social theorist
 France Winddance Twine (born 1960), American sociologist and ethnographer

U

 John Urry (1946–2016), British sociologist

V

 Mariana Valverde, Canadian sociologist
 Francisco Varela (1946–2001), Chilean biologist and philosopher
 Aninhalli Vasavi (born 1958), Indian sociologist
 Thorstein Veblen (1857–1929), American sociologist and economist
 Ruut Veenhoven, Dutch sociologist
 Calvin Veltman (born 1941), Canadian sociologist, demographer and sociolinguist
 Sudhir Alladi Venkatesh, American sociologist
 Alfred Vierkandt (1867–1953), German sociologist
 George Edgar Vincent (1864–1941), American sociologist
 Paul Virilio (1932–2018), French philosopher and social theorist
 Shiv Visvanathan, Indian sociologist and social scientist

W

 Loïc Wacquant, French sociologist
 Peter Wagner, German sociologist and social theorist
 Sylvia Walby, British sociologist
 Immanuel Wallerstein (1930–2019), American sociologist and historian
 Margit Warburg, Danish sociologist
 Lester Frank Ward (1841–1913), founder of American sociology
 Vron Ware, British educator and journalist 
 Duncan Watts, American mathematical sociologist and network theorist
 Emile Waxweiler (1867–1916), Belgian sociologist
 Beatrice Webb (1858–1943), British socialist and social theorist
 Sidney Webb (1859–1947), British socialist and social theorist
 Alfred Weber (1868–1958), German sociologist
 Marianne Weber (1870–1954), German sociologist
 Max Weber (1864–1920), German sociologist
 Frank Webster (born 1950), British sociologist
 Margaret Weir, sociologist and political scientist
 Barry Wellman (born 1942), Canadian/American sociologist
 Ida B. Wells-Barnett (1862–1931), American sociologist, journalist, social worker
 John Westergaard (1931–2003), British sociologist
 Edvard Westermarck (1862–1939), Finnish sociologist and philosopher
 Nathan Whetten (1900–1984), American sociologist and academic administrator
 Douglas R. White (1942–2021), American mathematical sociologist and anthropologist
 Harrison White, American sociologist
 William Foote Whyte (1914–2000), American sociologist
 William H. Whyte (1917–1999), American sociologist, journalist and peoplewatcher
 Saskia Wieringa (born in 1950), Dutch sociologist and professor
 Leopold von Wiese (1876–1969), German sociologist
 Michel Wieviorka (born 1946), French sociologist
 Jean-Paul Willaime (born 1947), French sociologist of religions
 Sidney M. Willhelm (1934–2018), American sociologist, author
 Raymond Williams (1921–1988), British sociologist, novelist, and critic
 Paul Willis (born 1945), British sociologist and social scientist
 Helmut Willke, German sociologist
 William Julius Wilson (born 1935), American sociologist
 Howard Winant, American sociologist
 Christopher Winship, American sociologist
 Louis Wirth (1897–1952), German/American sociologist
 Edmund Wnuk-Lipinski (1944–2015), Polish sociologist
 Mary Wollstonecraft (1759–1797), British social reformer
 Steve Woolgar, British sociologist
 Monroe Work (1866–1945), American sociologist
 Erik Olin Wright (1947–2019), American sociologist
 Robert Wuthnow, American sociologist

Y

 Lewis Yablonsky (1924–2014), American sociologist
 Kazuo Yamaguchi, Japanese sociologist, Department of Sociology, University of Chicago
 Masahiro Yamada, Japanese sociologist
 John Milton Yinger (1916–2011), American sociologist, president of the American Sociological Association 1976–1977
 Michael Young (1915–2002), British sociologist and Labour politician

Z

 Benjamin Zablocki (1941–2020), American sociologist and social psychologist
 Mayer Zald (1931–2012), American sociologist
 Tatyana Zaslavskaya (1927–2013), Russian sociologist
 René Zavaleta Mercado (1935–1984), Bolivian sociologist
 Viviana Zelizer, American sociologist
 Eviatar Zerubavel, American cognitive sociologist
 Jean Ziegler (born 1934), Swiss sociologist
 Florian Znaniecki (1882–1958), Polish/American sociologist
 Irving Zola (1935–1994), American medical sociologist and disability rights activist
 Tukufu Zuberi, American sociologist
 Harriet Zuckerman, American sociologist, specializes in science 
 Sharon Zukin, American sociologist

References

Sociologists
 
Sociologists